served as the Chairman of the National Board of Governors of the Boy Scouts of Japan.

Background
In 1985, Terao was awarded the 174th Bronze Wolf, the only distinction of the World Organization of the Scout Movement, awarded by the World Scout Committee for exceptional services to world Scouting. In 1978 he also received the highest distinction of the Scout Association of Japan, the Golden Pheasant Award.

References

Further reading
Dr. László Nagy, 250 Million Scouts, The World Scout Foundation and Dartnell Publishers, 1985, complete list through 1981

External links

Ichiro Terao in the 1940 Census per 1940 United States Census
http://katuragawa.iinaa.net/rt_shiryou/stop_BS_houkai/stop_BS_houkai_2.pdf

Recipients of the Bronze Wolf Award
Year of death missing
Year of birth missing
Scouting in Japan